The Federal Theatre (German - Bundestheater) is the umbrella organisation for all state-run theatres in Austria, including the Vienna State Opera, the Vienna Volksoper and the Burgtheater (with its smaller houses the Akademietheater and the Kasino am Schwarzenbergplatz), the Vienna State Ballet and organisational companies. With 2,500 employees, it is argued to be the largest theatrical concern in the world.

History

Before 1971

Bundestheaterverwaltung (1971-1999)

Bundestheater-Holding (1999-present)

Organisation and Aims

References

External links 
 Bundestheater
 Bundestheater-Holding
 Bundesministerium für Unterricht, Kunst und Kultur
 Österreichisches Staatsarchiv
 Projektbericht Studie der IHS (PDF; 520 kB)

1999 establishments in Austria
Theatre in Austria
Theatrical organizations
Companies based in Vienna
Innere Stadt